Textual variants in the Hebrew Bible manuscripts arise when a copyist makes deliberate or inadvertent alterations to the text that is being reproduced. Textual criticism of the Hebrew Bible (or Old Testament) has included study of its textual variants. 

Although the Masoretic Text (MT) counts as the authoritative form of the Hebrew Bible according to Rabbinic Judaism, modern scholars seeking to understand the history of the Hebrew Bible use a range of sources. These include the Greek Septuagint (LXX), the Syriac language Peshitta translation, the Samaritan Pentateuch, the Dead Sea Scrolls collection, and quotations from rabbinic manuscripts. These sources may be older than the Masoretic Text in some cases, and often differ from it. These differences have given rise to the theory that yet another text, an Urtext of the Hebrew Bible, once existed and is the source of the versions extant today. However, such an Urtext has never been found, and which of the three commonly known versions (Septuagint, Masoretic Text, Samaritan Pentateuch) is closest to the Urtext is debated.

Legend

List 

This list provides examples of known textual variants, and contains the following parameters: Hebrew texts written right to left, the Hebrew text romanised left to right, an approximate English translation, and which Hebrew manuscripts or critical editions of the Hebrew Bible this textual variant can be found in. Greek (Septuagint) and Latin (Vulgate) texts are written left to right, and not romanised. Sometimes additional translation or interpretation notes are added, with references to similar verses elsewhere, or in-depth articles on the topic in question.

Book of Genesis

Book of Exodus

Book of Leviticus

Book of Numbers

Book of Deuteronomy

Book of Joshua

Joshua 1 
Joshua 1:1
  – WLC
  – LXX LXX Brenton
  – ABP
  – Vg

Book of Judges

Books of Samuel

2 Samuel 8 
2 Samuel 8:12
  – WLC AC
  – LXX LXX Brenton ABP
  – Vg

2 Samuel 8:12
  – WLC
  – LXX LXX Brenton ABP
  – Vg
 Compare 1 Kings 16:15.

2 Samuel 8:13
  – WLC
  – LXX LXX Brenton ABP
  – Vg

2 Samuel 8:13
  – WLC
  – LXX Brenton ABP
  – LXX
  – Vg

2 Samuel 8:18
  – WLC. This noun is the origin of the surname Cohen.
  – LXX LXX Brenton ABP. This noun is a compound of αὐλή ("court(yard)" or "hall/chamber/house") and ἀρχή ("authority"), related to archon ("ruler" or "chief magistrate").
  – Vg. Origin of the modern term sacerdotalism.

Books of Kings

1 Kings 16 

1 Kings 16:15
  – WLC
  – LXX
  – LXX Brenton
  – ABP
  – Vg

1 Kings 16:15
  – WLC
  – LXX
  – LXX
  – Brenton
  – ABP
  – Vg

1 Kings 16:15
  – WLC
  – LXX LXX Brenton ABP
  – Vg

1 Kings 16:15
  – WLC
  – LXX. τῶν ἀλλοφύλων literally means 'of the [people] of another tribe'.
  – LXX Brenton ABP
  – Vg

1 Kings 16:16
  – WLC
  – LXX LXX Brenton ABP
  – Vg

1 Kings 16:16
  – WLC
  – LXX
  – LXX
  – Brenton
  – ABP
  – Vg

1 Kings 16:16
  – WLC
  – LXX
  – LXX
  – Brenton
  – ABP
  – Vg

1 Kings 16:16
  – WLC
  – LXX
  – LXX Brenton ABP
  – Vg

1 Kings 16:17
  – WLC
  – LXX
  – LXX Brenton
  – ABP
  – Vg

1 Kings 16:18
  – WLC
  – LXX
  – LXX ABP
  – Brenton
  – Vg

1 Kings 16:19
  – K
  – Q
  – LXX LXX Brenton ABP
  – Vg

1 Kings 16:19
  – WLC
  –  ABP
  – Vg
 omitted – LXX LXX Brenton

1 Kings 16:20
  – WLC
  – LXX LXX Brenton ABP
  – Vg

1 Kings 16:21
  – WLC
  – LXX
  – LXX
  – Brenton
  – ABP
  – Vg

1 Kings 16:21
  – WLC
  – LXX
  – LXX
  – Brenton
  – ABP
  – Vg

1 Kings 16:22
  – WLC
  – LXX. ἡττάομαι is an Attic variation of the verb ἡσσάομαι ("to be less/weaker than, to be defeated")
  – LXX Brenton
  – ABP
  – Vg

1 Kings 16:22
  – WLC
  – LXX
  – LXX
  – Brenton
  – ABP
  – Vg

1 Kings 16:28
  – WLC
  – LXX
  – LXX
  – Brenton
  – ABP
  – Vg
 A long addition is found in the Septuagint of Codex Vaticanus following 1 Kings 16:28 (numbered as verses 28a–28h).

1 Kings 16:28a
  – LXX
  – LXX
  – Brenton
 omitted – WLC ABP Vg

1 Kings 16:28b
  – LXX LXX Brenton
 omitted – WLC ABP Vg

1 Kings 16:28c
  – LXX
  – LXX
  – Brenton
 omitted – WLC ABP Vg

1 Kings 16:28d
  – LXX LXX Brenton
 omitted – WLC ABP Vg

1 Kings 16:28e
  – LXX
  – LXX 
  – Brenton
 omitted – WLC ABP Vg

1 Kings 16:28f
  – LXX
  – LXX 
  – Brenton
 omitted – WLC ABP Vg

1 Kings 16:28g
  – LXX
  – LXX Brenton
 omitted – WLC ABP Vg

1 Kings 16:28h
  – LXX
  – LXX
  – Brenton
 omitted – WLC LXX ABP Vg

1 Kings 16:29
  – WLC
  – LXX
  – LXX
  – Brenton
  – ABP
  – Vg

1 Kings 16:30
  – LXX LXX
  – Brenton ABP 
 omitted – WLC Vg

1 Kings 16:31
  – LXX LXX Brenton
  – ABP

1 Kings 16:32
  – WLC
  – Kennicott
  – LXX LXX Brenton
  – ABP 
  – Vg

1 Kings 16:33
  – WLC
  – LXX LXX Brenton
  – ABP
  – Vg

1 Kings 16:33
  – WLC
  – LXX
  – LXX
  – Brenton
  – ABP
  – Vg

1 Kings 16:34
  – WLC
  – LXX
  – LXX
  – Brenton
  – ABP
  – Vg

1 Kings 16:34
  – K
  – Q
  – LXX
  – LXX
  – Brenton
  – ABP
  – Vg

Song of Songs

Song of Songs 1 

Songs 1:1
  – WLC
  – LXX
  – LXX
  – Brenton
  – ABP
 omitted – Vg. Note: because Vg omits the first verse, it has only 16 verses in this chapter; the numbering shifts backwards, so that verse 1:2 in Hebrew and Greek becomes verse 1:1 in Latin etc.

Songs 1:3
  – WLC
  – LXX LXX Brenton
  – ABP
  – Vg

Songs 1:5
  – WLC
  – LXX
  – LXX Brenton ABP
  – Vg

Songs 1:5
  – LXX
  – LXX Brenton
  – ABP

Songs 1:6
  – WLC
  – LXX LXX Brenton
  – ABP
  – Vg

Songs 1:13
  – WLC
  – LXX Brenton ABP
  – Vg
 omitted – LXX

Songs 1:14
  – WLC
  – LXX Brenton ABP. κύπρος is a Semitic loanword identical with Hebrew  kōp̱er, meaning "henna". When capitalised, this word is identical to the Greek name of Cyprus, which may or may not have been derived from this word.
  – Vg. cyprus, not to be confused with the island of Cyprus, is the latinisation of κύπρος, and the origin of the English word cypress.
 omitted – LXX

Songs 1:16
  – WLC
  – LXX LXX Brenton ABP
  – Vg

Songs 1:17
  – K
  – Q

Song of Songs 2 
Songs 2:3
  – WLC
  – LXX LXX Brenton ABP. λάρυγξ is the origin of the modern English word larynx.
  – Vg. guttur is the origin of the modern English word goitre.

Songs 2:6
  – ABP Brenton (classical Greek spelling)
  – LXX LXX (Koine Greek spelling)
Compare Deuteronomy 22:30

Songs 2:7
  – LXX Brenton
  – LXX ABP

Songs 2:8
  – WLC
  – LXX LXX Brenton
  – ABP
  – Vg

Songs 2:9
  – LXX LXX Brenton
 omitted – WLC ABP Vg
 Compare Songs 2:17.

Songs 2:17
  – WLC
  – LXX LXX Brenton ABP
  – Vg
 Compare Songs 2:9.

Song of Songs 3 
Songs 3:3
  – WLC
  – LXX LXX. From the verb οἶδα ("to know").
  – Brenton ABP. From the verb εἶδον ("to see").
  – Vg. The Latin verb vidēo ("I see") is the origin of the modern English word video.

Songs 3:7
  – LXX LXX Brenton
  – ABP

Songs 3:8
  – WLC
  – LXX LXX Brenton ABP
  – Vg
 Compare Judges 19:29.

Songs 3:9
  – WLC
  – LXX LXX Brenton
  – ABP
  – Vg

Songs 3:10
  – LXX LXX Brenton
  – ABP

Songs 3:11
  – WLC
  – LXX LXX
  – Brenton
  – ABP
  – Vg

Book of Isaiah 
Isaiah 7:14
  – WLC 1QIsa
  – Targ
  – LXX LXX ABP Brenton
  – Vg Vg

See also 
 List of Hebrew Bible manuscripts

Notes

References

Bibliography 
 
 
 
 
  (E-book edition)
 
 Emanuel Tov, The Text-Critical Use of the Septuagint in Biblical Research (TCU), 1981 (1st edition), 1997 (2nd edition), 2015 (3rd edition).
 Emanuel Tov, Textual Criticism of the Hebrew Bible (TCHB), 1992 (1st edition), 2001 (2nd edition), 2012 (3rd edition).
 Emanuel Tov, Textual Criticism of the Hebrew Bible, Qumran, Septuagint: Collected Writings, Volume 3 (2015).

External links 
 Digitized Hebrew and Greek Manuscripts: Access and Issues – Introduction to online biblical textual studies

Biblical criticism
Early versions of the Bible
Hebrew Bible
Hebrew Bible versions and translations
Jewish manuscripts
Old Testament-related lists
Septuagint manuscripts
Textual criticism